is a train station located in Ariake-chō, Shimabara, Nagasaki. The station is serviced by Shimabara Railway and is a part of the Shimabara Railway Line.

Lines 
The train station is serving for the Shimabara Railway Line, with local trains stop at the station.

Platforms 
The station consists of a side platform with one track that serves for the Shimabara Railway Line.

History 

Adjacent stations

See also 
 List of railway stations in Japan

References

External links 
 

Railway stations in Japan opened in 1919
Railway stations in Nagasaki Prefecture
Stations of Shimabara Railway